Hassan Abdullah Al-Absi (born 1966) is a Saudi Arabian former cyclist. He competed in the individual road race and team time trial events at the 1984 Summer Olympics.

References

External links
 

1966 births
Living people
Saudi Arabian male cyclists
Olympic cyclists of Saudi Arabia
Cyclists at the 1984 Summer Olympics
Place of birth missing (living people)